Oknha Ly Hong Phat (born 1958) is a Sino-Cambodian senator and businessman. He owns LYP Group, a major conglomerate in Cambodia, with interests in tobacco, electricity, casinos and tourism. He has a major business presence in Koh Kong province, where he was born. Yong Phat's businesses have been linked to numerous controversies, including the use of child labour and forced land evictions. On 6 December 2022, he was appointed as prime minister Hun Sen's personal advisor.

Personal life 
Hong Phat is a Chinese Cambodian. He holds dual Thai-Cambodian citizenship.

He is married to Kim Heang, and has several children, including Ly Yaowalak, Phat Bunhour and Ly Arporn. Yaowalak is married to Phu Sae Ping, the child of Kok An. Arporn is married to a business tycoon Seng Nhak.

References 

Cambodian businesspeople
21st-century Cambodian politicians
Cambodian People's Party politicians
Living people
Members of the National Assembly (Cambodia)
Members of the Senate (Cambodia)
1958 births
People from Koh Kong province
Ly Yong Phat